Velké Hoštice is a municipality and village in Opava District in the Moravian-Silesian Region of the Czech Republic. It has about 1,800 inhabitants. It is part of the historic Hlučín Region.

History
The first written mention of Velké Hoštice is from 1222, when the village was bequeathed to the monastery in Velehrad. From the beginning of the 14th century until 1420 it was property of the lords of Kravaře. In the following centuries the village changed owners frequently, including burghers and lower nobles. In 1639, half of the village was destroyed by fire.

Since 1742 the village belonged to Prussia after Maria Theresa had been defeated. In 1754, the Velké Hoštice manor was inherited by Count Ignác Dominik Chorynský of Ledská, who was its most important owner. He made Velké Hoštice a cultural centre and had built the Baroque castle. After the castle under construction and most of the village were destroyed by fire in 1765, the count was responsible for the restoration of the village and the castle, and also had a church built.

Sights

Velké Hoštice Castle is a late Baroque castle with rich Rococo decor. Today the castle is owned by the municipality. The castle is used for social and commercial purposes, and houses an archaeological exhibition and an exhibition of recent history of the municipality.

The second landmark of Velké Hoštice is the Church of Saint John the Baptist, built in 1772.

Notable people
René de Nebesky-Wojkowitz (1923–1959), ethnologist and Tibetologist

References

External links

Villages in Opava District
Hlučín Region